Al Warraq is a municipal district of the Giza city in Egypt, consisting of both mainland and Warraq Island in the River Nile.

The district is located on the site of an ancient city Kerkasoros, which hosted the observatory Eudoxus of Cnidus worked at.

Geography
Warraq Island is an island of area , located in the Cairo Governorate. About 3% of the area is government owned.

Population

2017 Warraq Island protests
According to Yahia el-Mahgraby, who was head of the local council of Warraq Island for 17 years, conflict between Warraq islanders and Egyptian national authorities date back to 1998 during the Atef Ebeid prime ministership, when Ebeid issued a decree declaring Warraq and other Nile islands as nature reserves, and in 2001 issued decree 542 declaring Warraq and another island, Dahab, to be expropriated for public use. Ebeid's cabinet claimed that Warraq and Dahab did not exist prior to the construction of the Aswan Dam. The islanders protested against the 2001 decree and took legal action against the government, winning their case in 2002.

In May 2017, Egyptian president Abdel Fattah el-Sisi announced a campaign for the state to recover state-owned land that was illegally occupied. In July, a rumour circulated that residents' houses on Warraq Island would be demolished and replaced by investment projects. Member of Parliament (MP) for Warraq Island Ahmed Youssef stated that 700 "enroachments" and 160 squatted homes were to be removed. Another Warraq Island MP, Mahmoud el-Saeedy, stated that insufficient communication between residents and security forces occurred. On 16 July 2017, security forces and construction equipment appeared on Warraq Island. Security forces and residents fought, with the death of a 23-year old, 24 injuries and 9 arrests. Warraq Island resident Mohamed Arafa stated that during the conflict on 16 July, "furnished houses were demolished and some residents were kicked out of their homes.

During the 16 July demolition, resident Heba Nagaa Otmorsi's house was demolished without warning while she was at work on the mainland. The demolition crews and security forces arrived early in the morning when "most families" were asleep. As a result of the protests by the islanders, only 9 buildings were demolished.

The Guardian reported on a 2010 plan to transform Warraq Island into "'Horus Island', complete with glossy towers, wide boulevards and a marina" and a 2013 proposal that included "a glass skyscraper, a glistening glass pyramid, and manicured riverside walkways" for restructuring the island. The plans retained in 2017 included the construction of a bridge, which The Guardian suggested was the first step in a similar plan for a major transformation of the whole island.

Warraq Island residents continued to protest during the week following the demolition.

See also
2019 Egyptian protests

References

Islands of the Nile
River islands of Egypt
Populated places in Giza Governorate